Anne Brusletto (born 24 January 1951) is a Norwegian alpine skier. She was born in Geilo. She participated at the 1972 Winter Olympics in Sapporo, where she competed in slalom and giant slalom.

She became Norwegian champion in giant slalom in 1970.

References

External links

1951 births
Living people
People from Hol
Norwegian female alpine skiers
Olympic alpine skiers of Norway
Alpine skiers at the 1972 Winter Olympics
Sportspeople from Viken (county)